Dead Man's Gulch is a 1943 American Western film directed by John English and written by Norman S. Hall and Robert Creighton Williams. The film stars Don "Red" Barry, Lynn Merrick, Clancy Cooper, Emmett Lynn, Malcolm 'Bud' McTaggart and John Vosper. The film was released on February 12, 1943, by Republic Pictures.

Plot

Cast 
Don "Red" Barry as Tennessee Colby
Lynn Merrick as Mary Logan
Clancy Cooper as Walt Bledsoe
Emmett Lynn as Fiddlefoot 
Malcolm 'Bud' McTaggart as Tommy Logan
John Vosper as Hobart Patterson
Jack Rockwell as Marshal Bat Matson
Pierce Lyden as Curley
Lee Shumway as Fred Beecher
Rex Lease as Henchman
Al Taylor as Henchman

References

External links
 

1943 films
American Western (genre) films
1943 Western (genre) films
Republic Pictures films
Films directed by John English
American black-and-white films
1940s English-language films
1940s American films